Ian Moore may refer to:

 Ian Moore (cricketer) (1941–2010), English cricketer
 Ian Moore (cyclist) (born 1938), Irish cyclist
 Ian Moore (musician) (born 1968), American guitarist and singer-songwriter
 Ian Moore (album), 1993
Ian Moore (comedian), British comedian

See also
 Ian Storey-Moore (born 1945), former English footballer
 Ian Thomas-Moore (born 1976), English footballer, known as Ian Moore
 Ian Moores (1954–1998), former English footballer